The Rock is a town with a population of 1,236, in the Riverina region of southern New South Wales, Australia, in Lockhart Shire.

The town is named after the large rocky hill overlooking the town, now called The Rock Hill but called Yerong in the local indigenous language. The reserve that includes The Rock Hill is an attraction in the area for bush-walking, rock-climbing, and observation of wildlife. It is also an Aboriginal sacred site, called Kengal.

History
The Rock Post Office opened on 1 September 1890.

Prior to 1919, the town had been known as Kingston, probably named for the King family which had operated the farm property known as "The Rock".  The name Kingston is shown on a 1916 map of the Riverina district. The King name survives with the hotel on the Olympic Highway at the town still named The King's Own.

Heritage listings 
The Rock has a number of heritage-listed sites, including:
 Main Southern railway: The Rock railway station

Sport and Recreation
The Rock Football Club was an Australian Rules Football club that was established in 1900 after a meeting at the King's Own Hotel. The club has played in the following football competitions -
 1900: Wagga United Football Association.
 1901: McLaurin Football Competition: Runners Up
 1902 - 09: Club active, playing friendly matches against local clubs and towns, but no evidence of playing in an official competition.
 1910 - 12: The Rock Football Association:  
 1913: Wagga United Football Association: Runners Up: 1913
 1914: Nathan Cup Competition - Premiers: 1914
 1915: Wagga Football Association.
 1916: Club active, but no official competition due to WW1.
 1917: The Culcairn Patriotic Football Association
 1918: Yerong Creek & District Football Association. The Rock played against Mangoplah and Yerong Creek.
 1919 - 1921: Wagga United Football Association. The Rock withdrew form the Wagga United FA in June & joined The Rock & District Football Association.
 1921: The Rock & District Football Association.
 1922: Riverina Main Line Football Association 
1923 - 1925: Wagga United Football Association. Runners Up: 1925 
 1926 - 1927: The Rock Football Association. Runners Up: 1927
 1928 - Wagga & District Football Association. Runners Up: 1928 As the minor premiers, Magoplah were entitled to challenge The Rock to another game and ultimately won the Grand Final replay.
 1929 - 1937: The Rock & District Football League: Premiers: 1932, 1936 Runners Up: 1934, 1937
 1938 - 1940: Albury & District Football League: 1938 - 1940. 
 1941 - 1944: Club in recess due to WW2.
 1945 - 1947: Milbrulong & District League: Premiers: 1945, 1947 (undefeated)
 1948 - 1957: Albury & District Football League: Runners Up: 1948, 1956 & 1957.
1957 - 1961: Farrer Football League
1962 - Farrer Football League: The Rock FC & Yerong Creek FC merged in 1962 to form The Rock Yerong Creek FC.

The Rock Cricket Club won the 1938/39 Henty & District Cricket Association premiership, defeating Henty. The Rock scored 7/441 in their second innings, with the three Taylor brothers all scoring centuries!

Transport
It is a railway junction town, being the junction point of the Boree Creek line from the Main South line. The Rock railway station is served by the twice daily NSW TrainLink XPT service to Melbourne and Sydney.

Links
1939 – Mangoplah FC & The Rock FC team photos
1948 - Albury & DFL grand final teams: Mangoplah FC & The Rock FC team photos

References 

Towns in the Riverina
Towns in New South Wales